Peçi is an Albanian surname. Notable people with this name include:

 Aleksandër Peçi (born 1951), Albanian composer
 Eno Peçi (born 19??), Albanian male ballet dancer
 Majkel Peçi (born 1996), Albanian footballer
 Sotir Peçi (1873–1932), Albanian politician, educator and mathematician

References 

Albanian-language surnames